Město Libavá is a municipality and village in Olomouc District in the Olomouc Region of the Czech Republic. It has about 600 inhabitants.

Administrative parts
The village of Heroltovice is an administrative part of Město Libavá.

History
The first written mention of Město Libavá is from 1301, when it was a property of Roman Catholic Archdiocese of Olomouc.

Město Libavá became a separate municipality on 1 January 2016 by reduction of Libavá Military Training Area.

Notable people
John M. Oesterreicher (1904–1993), Austrian-American Catholic theologian

References

Villages in Olomouc District